Sir Samuel Walker, 1st Baronet, PC (Ire), KC (19 June 1832 – 13 August 1911) was an Irish Liberal politician, lawyer and judge. He was the first of the Walker baronets of Pembroke House.

Career

He was born at Gore Port, Finea, County Westmeath, a younger son of Captain Alexander Walker and his wife Elizabeth Elliott. He was educated at Portarlington School and Trinity College Dublin. He entered Gray's Inn before being called to the bar in 1855. He quickly became one of the leaders of the Irish Chancery bar: in 1872 he was made a Queen's Counsel, and eleven years later he became Ireland's Solicitor General. The following year, he was elected Liberal Member of Parliament for Londonderry, a seat he held for little more than a year before the constituency was divided, and in 1885 he was also for a period the island's Attorney-General. His celebrated remark that on entering the House of Commons "he was amazed to hear Members making factual statements without sworn affidavits to support them" was probably a joke. He himself rarely spoke in the House, but his rare speeches were enlivened by a dry wit.

An advocate for Home Rule, Walker remained within the Liberal Party after its split, and was eventually appointed Lord Chancellor of Ireland when Gladstone returned to power in 1892. When Lord Rosebery's ministry fell three years later, he was made a Lord Justice of Appeal, and remained in this capacity until his reappointment as Lord Chancellor by the Liberal government in 1905. He lived at Pembroke Hall, Upper Mount Street in Dublin city. He was created a baronet the following year, and died rather suddenly, while still in office, at his Dublin house Pembroke Hall in 1911. He is buried in Mount Jerome Cemetery, beside his first wife Cecilia and his daughter Alice.

Character and reputation

He was a lawyer of great ability, and went on to become one of a remarkable group of Irish judges, which included Christopher Palles, Hugh Holmes, and Gerald FitzGibbon, who gave the Irish Court of Appeal, in the years 1890–1910, a reputation for judicial eminence which has never been equalled by any other Irish Court, and could bear comparison with any equivalent English court.

Maurice Healy praised him as "a loyal friend and a man of courage" but thought that these qualities sometimes led him into acts of political recklessness. His insistence on appointing Matthias Bodkin, a leading journalist and a staunch political ally, to a County Court judgeship, was a serious political blunder. Although Bodkin was a qualified barrister, legitimate doubts had been raised by Walker's political opponents as to whether he had the necessary years of practice to qualify for appointment to the Bench. The result was an action for quo warranto challenging the validity of Bodkin's appointment, which gravely embarrassed the Government, although no harm ultimately came of it: the case was resolved amicably and Bodkin, by general agreement, proved to be an excellent judge.

Family

He married firstly in 1855 Cecilia Charlotte Greene, daughter of Arthur Greene and  Frances  Shaw, and a niece of the eminent judge Richard Wilson Greene, with whom he had six children, including Alexander, the second baronet, and Alice, who died in 1949. Cecilia died in 1880.  He married secondly in 1881 Eleanor McLaughlin, with whom he had two more children, including Cecil, who succeeded his half-brother Alexander as third baronet.

Samuel's elder brother was General Sir Mark Walker VC KCB.

Arms

References 

Ball, F. Elrington  The Judges in Ireland 1221-1921 John Murray London 1926
Burke's Peerage 107th Edition  Delaware 2003
Delaney, V.T.H  Christopher Palles  Allen Figgis and Co Dublin 1960
Healy, Maurice  The Old Munster Circuit  Michael Joseph Ltd. 1939

External links 

1832 births
1911 deaths
Attorneys-General for Ireland
Baronets in the Baronetage of the United Kingdom
Irish barristers
Irish Liberal Party MPs
Lord chancellors of Ireland
Members of the Parliament of the United Kingdom for County Londonderry constituencies (1801–1922)
Politicians from County Westmeath
Solicitors-General for Ireland
UK MPs 1880–1885
Members of the Privy Council of Ireland
Lords Justice of Appeal for Ireland